Frawley is a surname. Notable people with the surname include:

 Arthur J. Frawley (c.1899–1969), American politician
 Barbara Frawley (1935–2004), Australian actress and voice artist
 Ciarán Frawley (born 1997), Irish rugby union player
 Craig Frawley (born 1980), Australian rugby league footballer
 Damien Frawley (born 1962), international rugby union player
 Dan Frawley (1882–1967), pioneer Australian rugby league footballer
 Dan Frawley (ice hockey) (born 1962), Canadian hockey player best known as captain of the Pittsburgh Penguins
 Danny Frawley (1963–2019), Australian rules footballer, coach and commentator
 David Frawley, American author on Hinduism
 Des Frawley (1924–1996), Australian politician
 James Frawley (born 1937), American director and actor
 James Frawley (Australian rules footballer) (born 1988)
 James Frawley (tennis) (born 1994), Australian tennis player
 James J. Frawley (1867–1926), New York State Senator and Tammany Hall leader
 John Frawley (disambiguation)
 Lee Frawley (born 1954), equestrian
 Matt Frawley (born 1994), Australian rugby league player
 Maurice Frawley (1954–2009), Australian musician
 Mick Frawley (1885–1919), Australian rugby league footballer 
 Rod Frawley (born 1952), Australian tennis player
 William Frawley (1887–1966), American actor best known for playing Fred Mertz on I Love Lucy

See also
 Frawley Ranch, South Dakota